National Route 203 is a national highway of Japan connecting Karatsu, Saga and Saga, Saga in Japan, with a total length of 47.3 km (29.39 mi).

References

National highways in Japan
Roads in Saga Prefecture